Route 224 is a provincial highway located in the Montérégie region of Quebec. The 48-kilometer road runs from the junction of Route 137 south of Saint-Hyacinthe and runs northeastward pass Route 116 and Autoroute 20 towards its terminus in Saint-Bonaventure at the junction of Route 143. It is also concurrent with Route 239 in Saint-Marcel-de-Richelieu.

Municipalities along Route 224
 Saint-Hyacinthe
 Saint-Simon
 Saint Hugues
 Saint-Marcel-de-Richelieu
 Saint-Guillaume
 Saint-Bonaventure

See also
 List of Quebec provincial highways

References

External links 
 Official Road Map Network of Transports Quebec 
 Route 224 on Google Maps

224
Transport in Saint-Hyacinthe